The Carmelite sunbird (Chalcomitra fuliginosa) is a species of bird in the family Nectariniidae.
It is found in Liberia as well as the lower Congo River and coastal areas of western and central Africa down to central Angola.

References

Carmelite sunbird
Birds of West Africa
Birds of the Gulf of Guinea
Birds of Central Africa
Carmelite sunbird
Taxonomy articles created by Polbot